George Fraser Black (1866 – September 7, 1948) was a Scottish-born American librarian, historian and linguist. He worked at the New York Public Library for more than three decades, and he was the author of several books about Scottish culture and anthroponymy, gypsies and witchcraft.

Early life
George Fraser Black was born in 1866 in Scotland. He earned a PhD before emigrating to the United States.

Career
Black became a librarian, historian and linguist. He worked at the New York Public Library from 1896 to 1931. He authored several books about Scotland, especially its folklore, witchcraft and surnames, as well as gypsies. In Scotland's Mark on America, Black writes about the contributions made by Americans of Scottish descent, including many presidents.

Black collected books about witchcraft, some of which were later acquired by Fairleigh Dickinson University, followed by Drew University. Among them is a copy of Malleus Maleficarum, co-authored by Heinrich Kramer and Jacob Sprenger.

Death
Black died on September 7, 1948 in Lyndhurst, New Jersey, where he resided.

Selected works

References

External links
 
 

1866 births
1948 deaths
Scottish emigrants to the United States
People from Lyndhurst, New Jersey
American librarians
New York Public Library people
Scottish folklorists
20th-century American historians
American male non-fiction writers
Historians of witchcraft
Linguists from the United States
Linguists of Romani
Witchcraft in Scotland
20th-century American male writers
Historians from New Jersey